Maple Bluff is a village in Dane County, Wisconsin, United States. The population was 1,313 at the 2010 census. A suburb of Madison, it is part of the Madison Metropolitan Statistical Area.

Maple Bluff is the site of the Wisconsin Governor's Mansion, the residence of the governor of Wisconsin and their family. The Robert M. La Follette House is also in Maple Bluff.

Municipal services
Maple Bluff is served by the Maple Bluff Police Department. The Maple Bluff Fire Department provides fire protection service and non-transporting emergency medical service to the village. Ambulance transport services are contracted to a private ambulance provider.

Geography 
Maple Bluff is located at  (43.110945, -89.368263).

Demographics

2010 census 
As of the census of 2010, there were 1,313 people, 547 households, and 401 families living in the village. The racial makeup of the village was 95.9% White, 1.1% African American, 0.3% Native American, 0.8% Asian, 0.5% from other races, and 1.4% from two or more races. Hispanic or Latino of any race were 1.4% of the population.

There were 681 households, of which 29.1% had children under the age of 18 living with them, 67.5% were married couples living together, 3.5% had a female householder with no husband present, 2.4% had a male householder with no wife present, and 26.7% were non-families. 20.5% of all households were made up of individuals, and 6.5% had someone living alone who was 65 years of age or older. The average household size was 2.40 and the average family size was 2.79.

The median age in the village was 48 years. 22.3% of residents were under the age of 18; 3.2% were between the ages of 18 and 24; 19.3% were from 25 to 44; 38.8% were from 45 to 64; and 16.4% were 65 years of age or older. The gender makeup of the village was 49.4% male and 50.6% female.

2000 census 
As of the census of 2000, there were 1,358 people, 541 households, and 407 families living in the village. The population density was 1,944.1 people per square mile (749.0/km2). There were 557 housing units, at an average density of 797.4 per square mile (307.2/km2). The racial makeup of the village was 97.13% White, 1.33% African American, 0.22% Native American, 0.37% Asian, 0.29% from other races, and 0.66% from two or more races. Hispanic or Latino of any race were 0.66% of the population.

There were 541 households, out of which 31.4% had children under the age of 18 living with them, 69.7% were married couples living together, 4.3% had a female householder with no husband present, and 24.6% were non-families. 19.0% of all households were made up of individuals, and 9.1% had someone living alone who was 65 years of age or older. The average household size was 2.51 and the average family size was 2.88.

In the village, the population was spread out, with 24.0% under the age of 18, 4.3% from 18 to 24, 22.2% from 25 to 44, 31.6% from 45 to 64, and 17.9% who were 65 years of age or older. The median age was 45 years. For every 100 females, there were 93.2 males. For every 100 females age 18 and over, there were 91.5 males.

The median income for a household in the village was $111,400, and the median income for a family was $129,961. Males had a median income of $83,074 versus $50,000 for females. The per capita income for the village was $66,380. About 1.7% of families and 2.5% of the population were below the poverty line, including 1.2% of those under age 18 and 2.1% of those age 65 or over.

Notable people 
 Connie Carpenter-Phinney - Olympic speed skater, Olympic gold medal winner in road cycling
 Thomas E. Coleman - Chairman of the Republican Party of Wisconsin
 Chris Farley - comedian, actor, Saturday Night Live alumnus
 Jim Montgomery - Olympic gold medal winner in swimming
 Bradley Whitford - actor
 Jane Wiedlin - rhythm guitarist of The Go-Go's, actress
 Thornton Wilder - Pulitzer Prize-winning author and playwright

References

Further reading
 McLean, Doug. "Maple Bluff: Madison's Beautiful North Shore Suburb". Historic Madison: A Journal of the Four Lake Region, vol. 12 (1995): 3-17.

External links

 Official village website

Villages in Wisconsin
Villages in Dane County, Wisconsin
Madison, Wisconsin, metropolitan statistical area